Bazhen Wan is a brownish-black pill used in Traditional Chinese medicine to "replenish qi and blood". It is slightly bitter and sweet in taste. It is used when there is "deficiency of both qi and blood with sallow complexion, anorexia, lack of strength and excessive menstrual discharge". A honey solution is used as a binding agent to make the pill.

Chinese classic herbal formula

See also
 Chinese classic herbal formula
 Bu Zhong Yi Qi Wan

References

Traditional Chinese medicine pills